Walter Omar Kohan is a Professor of Philosophy of Education at the State University of Rio de Janeiro, Brazil. He is also a researcher at the National Council for Scientific and Technological Development (CNPQ) and the Carlos Chagas Filho Research Support Foundation (FAPERJ). He was previously President of the International Council of Philosophical Inquiry with Children (ICPIC).

References 

Year of birth missing (living people)
Living people
Academic staff of the Rio de Janeiro State University